Holcocera coccivorella, the scale-feeding scavenger moth, is a moth in the  family Blastobasidae. It is found in North America, including Florida and Maine.

Larvae have been reared on coccid-scales found on an oak.

References

Moths described in 1880
coccivorella